William Wright Arnold (October 14, 1877 – November 23, 1957) was an American politician and jurist, serving as a U.S. representative from Illinois and a judge of the United States Tax Court.

Life and career
Born in Oblong, Illinois, Arnold attended the country schools of his native county and Austin College, Effingham, Illinois. He graduated from the law department of the University of Illinois in 1901. He was admitted to the bar the same year and commenced the practice of law in Robinson, Illinois. He was continuously engaged in the practice of his chosen profession until elected to Congress.

Arnold was elected as a Democrat to the Sixty-eighth and to the six succeeding Congresses and served from March 4, 1923, until his resignation, effective September 16, 1935, having been appointed July 29, 1935, a member of the United States Board of Tax Appeals (which became the United States Tax Court during his service). He was reappointed in 1944 and served until his retirement June 30, 1950. He owned and operated two large farms. He served as director of the Second National Bank, Farmers and Producers Bank, and the First National Bank of Robinson.

Death
He died in Robinson, Illinois on November 23, 1957. He was interred in New Cemetery.

References

1877 births
1957 deaths
Judges of the United States Tax Court
United States Article I federal judges appointed by Franklin D. Roosevelt
20th-century American judges
Democratic Party members of the United States House of Representatives from Illinois
People from Crawford County, Illinois
University of Illinois College of Law alumni
Members of the United States Board of Tax Appeals